John C. Carpenter may refer to:

 John Carpenter (athlete) (John Condict Carpenter, 1884–1933), American athlete
 John C. Carpenter (politician) (1930–2016), American businessman, rancher, and politician